The Barnett-Attwood House is a historic house outside New Edinburg in Cleveland County, Arkansas. It is believed to be the oldest standing structure in the county.

Description and history 
It was built c. 1835-36 by Nathaniel Barnett, one of the earliest settlers in the area. The structure he built is a five-room dogtrot house fashioned out of hand hewn pine timbers with square notches. This original structure still rests on its original pilings, but is also supported by a brick foundation. In 1961, its owner, C. W. Attwood, a Barnett descendant, added an L-shaped addition onto the rear, and renovated the original portion of the house, carefully maintaining the appearance by using hand hewn timbers when necessary.

The house was listed on the National Register of Historic Places on July 29, 1977.

See also
National Register of Historic Places listings in Cleveland County, Arkansas

References

Houses on the National Register of Historic Places in Arkansas
Houses completed in 1836
Houses in Cleveland County, Arkansas
National Register of Historic Places in Cleveland County, Arkansas